Aglaope is a genus of moths of the family Zygaenidae.

Selected species
 Aglaope infausta – almond-tree leaf skeletonizer moth (Linnaeus, 1767)
 Aglaope labasi
 Aglaope meridionalis
 Aglaope sanguifasciata

References
 Aglaope at Markku Savela's Lepidoptera and Some Other Life Forms

Chalcosiinae
Zygaenidae genera

el:Αγλαόπη
pt:Aglaope